The Mammal Neogene zones or MN zones are system of biostratigraphic zones in the stratigraphic record used to correlate mammal-bearing fossil localities of the Neogene period of Europe. It consists of seventeen consecutive zones (numbered MN 1 through MN 18; MN 7 and 8 have been joined into MN 7/8 zone) defined through reference faunas, well-known sites that other localities can be correlated with. MN 1 is the earliest zone, and MN 18 is the most recent. The MN zones are complementary with the MP zones in the Paleogene.

The zones are as follows:

See also
 MP zonation
 European land mammal age
 Geologic time scale

References
 Bruijn, H. de, Daams, R., Daxner-Höck, G., Fahlbusch, V., Ginsburg, L., Mein, P. and Morales, J. (1992.) "Report of the RCMNS working group on fossil mammals", Reisensburg 1990. Newsletters on Stratigraphy 26(2–3):65–118.
 Dam, J. A. van, Alcalá, L., Alonso Zarza, A., Calvo, J. P., Garcés, M. and Krijgsman, W. (2001.) "The Upper Miocene mammal record from the Teruel–Alfambra region (Spain). The MN system and continental stage/age concepts discussed." Journal of Vertebrate Paleontology 21(2):367–385. .

.
.
Neogene Europe
Miocene animals of Europe
Pliocene animals of Europe
Neogene mammals of Europe